The Bicol River is the eighth largest river in the Philippines in terms of drainage basin size with an estimated catchment area of . The river drains a large part of southwestern Bicol Peninsula of the island of Luzon and passes through Camarines Sur province.

It passes through Naga City, the alluvial and coastal plains of the vast Bicol Valley, an elongated, northwesterly trending depression in the Bicol Region, which contains alluvial plains to the coastal plain. Average slope within the river's drainage basin is 0.006%.

The basin has an influence area of  including its drainage basin. It lies between 13°0 to 14°N and 123°0 and 124°0 E. It is extensively a coastal flood plain.

Geology and geomorphology
The Bicol River is bounded on the northeast by the Bicol Cordillera, which consists of a chain of volcanic mountains including Mount Iriga, Mount Malinao, Mount Masaraga and Mount Mayon. On the southwestern side lie the Ragay Hills, which consists of folded and faulted sedimentary formations including limestones, siltstones, conglomerates and shale. In between these higher areas lies the Bicol plain, which is composed of thick alluvial deposits of sand silt and clay.

The main geo-morphological features found in the area include the estuarine plain, a river flood plain, the piedmont plain and the valleys of incised creeks. The estuarine plain is level to nearly level and consists of fine fluvial-marine deposits over sandy layers with marine shells. The river floodplain is made up of mixed alluvium. The piedmont plain on the fringe of the Ragay Hills consists of fine alluvium clay and reworked colluviums.

Climate
The climate is influenced by the Northeast Monsoon winds and the Pacific trade winds. These Monsoon winds create the low pressure area in the Pacific Ocean, resulting in tropical cyclones that affect the area in November and December.

Rainfall occurs throughout the year with low rainfall between January to May and high rainfall between June and December. The main factors influencing rainfall are the air streams, the intertropical convergence zone and topography.

Crossings 
This is listed from mouth to source.

 Malbong Hanging Bridge (Gainza, Camarines Sur)
 Old Mabolo Bridge (Felix Plazo Street, Naga–Milaor boundary)
 Unnamed Philippine National Railways bridge, Naga–Milaor boundary
 Mabolo Bridge (Naga–Milaor boundary)
 FVR Bridge I (Milaor, Camarines Sur)
 Unnamed bridge in Bula, Camarines Sur
 Sto. Domingo Bridge (Nabua–Balatan Road, Nabua, Camarines Sur)

References

Rivers of the Philippines